The Kadava Patidar (also variously spelled Kadwa, Kadva) are a sub-caste of the Patidars in Gujarat. They are mainly found in North Gujarat and Ahmedabad. They were dependent on cash-crop agriculture and occupied a lower status than the wealthy Leva Patidars. The name "Kadava" comes from "Kadi", a former district that existed during the Baroda State. However a popular belief among the community is that Kadava descend from Kusha, son of the deity Rama in the Hindu epic Ramayana. According to Shah in 1982, the Kadva Patidars have received extremely little attention from scholars in comparison to Leva Patidars, which was part of a wider trend among scholars that ignored north Gujarat.

References

Indian castes
Social groups of Gujarat